UGC Fox Distribution (UFD) was a French-American film production company formed in 1995 by joint venture between UGC and 20th Century Fox (now known as 20th Century Studios) to produce and distribute films across France. Throughout its time, UFD has come to produce such successful films as Amélie. UFD also distributed many French-language 20th Century Fox films (along with subsidiaries; Fox Searchlight and New Regency), as well as films by MGM.

In early 2005, UFD dissolved and was absorbed into the French division of Fox Entertainment Group.

References

Defunct film and television production companies
Film distributors of France
Mass media companies established in 1995
Mass media companies disestablished in 2005
20th Century Studios
Metro-Goldwyn-Mayer
Walt Disney Studios (division)